Pavel Sergeyevich Tonkov (born 9 February 1969 in Izhevsk) is a former professional road racing cyclist from Russia. His talents were first showcased when winning the world junior title as part of the Soviet Union team in 1987. This alerted the world to his talents, and he turned pro in 1992 with the RUSS-Baïkal team.

Professional career

His biggest success was the overall win in the 1996 Giro d'Italia. He went on to place 2nd in the following two editions of the Italian race and all total he placed in the top 5 of the Giro on seven occasions. He also had two top 5 performances in the Vuelta and while he entered the Tour de France on three occasions he never completed one.

He won the 1995 Tour de Suisse and the 1997 Tour de Romandie. He placed 3rd overall in the 2000 Vuelta a España.

Throughout much of his career, he was a client of the controversial Michele Ferrari.

He retired in 2005.

Personal life

He lives in Córdoba, Spain, where he manages a hotel.

Career achievements

Major results

1987
 1st  Road race, UCI Junior Road World Championships
1989
 1st  Overall Tour du Poitou-Charentes et de la Vienne
1st Stage 2 (ITT)
 1st  Overall Okolo Slovenska
1st Stage 7
1990 
 1st Stage 7a Peace Race
1992
 7th Overall Giro d'Italia
1st  Young rider classification
 10th Giro dell'Emilia
1993
 5th Overall Giro d'Italia
1st  Young rider classification
 5th Overall Tour de Suisse
1st Stage 4
 9th Overall Tour de Romandie
1994
 2nd Overall Grand Prix du Midi Libre
1st Stage 1
 4th Overall Giro d'Italia
 8th Overall Tour de Romandie
 9th Overall Vuelta a Murcia
 10th Trofeo Pantalica
1995
 1st  Overall Tour de Suisse
1st  Combination classification
1st Stage 7
 4th Overall Giro del Trentino
 6th Overall Giro d'Italia
 6th Chrono des Nations
 9th Overall Tour de Romandie
1996
 1st  Overall Giro d'Italia
1st Stage 13
 1st Stage 1 Tour de Romandie
 2nd Giro dell'Appennino
 9th Overall Escalada a Montjuïc
1997
 1st  Overall Tour de Romandie
1st Stage 4
 1st Giro dell'Appennino
 Vuelta a España
1st Stages 13 & 15 
 2nd Overall Giro d'Italia
1st Stages 3 (ITT), 5 & 21
 2nd Overall Giro del Trentino
 5th Overall Volta a Catalunya
 7th Trofeo dello Scalatore
 8th Overall Tour of Galicia
1998
 1st Giro dell'Appennino
 2nd Overall Giro d'Italia
1st Stage 18
 9th Overall Tour de Romandie
1999
 1st Luk-Cup Bühl
 2nd Giro dell'Appennino
 4th Overall Vuelta a España
 9th Tre Valli Varesine
 10th Overall Tour de Romandie
2000
 2nd Road race, National Road Championships
 3rd Overall Vuelta a España
 5th Overall Giro d'Italia
 6th Luk-Cup Bühl
 9th Overall Tour of Galicia
 10th Overall Volta a Catalunya
2001
 1st  Mountains classification Tour of the Basque Country
 2nd Overall Critérium du Dauphiné
1st  Combination classification
 3rd Classique des Alpes
 5th Overall Euskal Bizikleta
 7th Road race, National Road Championships
2002
 5th Overall Giro d'Italia
1st Stage 17
 6th Overall Tour de Suisse
2003
 3rd Giro dell'Appennino
2004
 1st Stage 17 Giro d'Italia
 5th Overall Giro del Trentino
 8th Giro dell'Appennino
2005
 1st  Overall Clasica Alcobendas
1st  Mountains classification
1st Stage 1
 8th Subida al Naranco
 9th Giro dell'Appennino

Grand Tour general classification results timeline

Notes

References 

1969 births
Living people
Sportspeople from Izhevsk
Russian male cyclists
Giro d'Italia winners
Russian Giro d'Italia stage winners
Russian Vuelta a España stage winners
Olympic cyclists of Russia
Cyclists at the 1996 Summer Olympics
Cyclists at the 2000 Summer Olympics
Tour de Suisse stage winners